Oakland Early College (OEC) is a five-year early college high school serving students throughout Oakland County, Michigan. It represents a partnership between the West Bloomfield School District and Oakland Community College's (OCC) Orchard Ridge campus.

Newsweek's annual ranking of public schools in America ranked OEC as #159.

OEC students attend high school on OCC's campus and engage in a college-preparatory curriculum taught by teachers from West Bloomfield School District.

OEC students participate in an integrated sequence of high school and college courses during grades 9-13. They graduate with their high school diplomas, educational and professional experiences in a small school environment, and at least 30 transferable college credits towards their undergraduate degree and/or an Associate Degree from Oakland Community College with no cost of tuition for students and their families.

Eligibility 
Oakland Early College is open to students throughout Oakland County, Michigan. Oakland Early College is a public Early College High School.  There is no out-of-pocket cost for attending to students or their families.

College success rates 

A core component of the Oakland Early College experience is integrated dual enrollment in college coursework at Oakland Community College.  During the 2009-2010 academic year, OEC students enrolled in approximately 650 college courses, earning approximately 1850 credits.  For the most recently completed term, Summer I 2010, students passed over 98% of their college coursework, and carried an average course GPA in college of about 3.3 GPA.  The transferability rate for college coursework—meaning grades of C− or higher—was approximately 97%.  During the previous full, 15-week semester, Winter 2010, students passed approximately 94% of their college courses—again, a substantially higher pass rate than traditional college students—with a transfer rate of about 85%.  In doing so, they carried about a B average in their college coursework.

College success rates have remained fairly consistent throughout the school's history, but have trended upwards since its inception.

OEC students are represented within the college's Phi Theta Kappa Alpha Omicron Xi Chapter Honor Society and have the opportunity to participate in the numerous student life options that Oakland Community College has to offer.

Graduation requirements 

Oakland Early College's graduation requirements extend well beyond the State of Michigan's Merit Curriculum requirements.  Proficiency in at least one world language, participation in a capstone project, completion of a career portfolio, proficiency to levels 1 or 2 on the Michigan Merit Exam, and a minimum of 30 college credits (with the opportunity to approach 60 college credits and/or their associate degree) are required for graduation from Oakland Early College.

Pace of study 

Oakland Early College students have full access to the over 160 degree pathways at Oakland Community College.  In general, students at OEC graduate with both their high school diploma and their associate degree, and/or two years of transferable college credit.

Students at Oakland Early College matriculate from grade 9 through grade 13, with entry available through 12th grade.

By grade 11, each student is enrolled in a blend of college and high school courses.

By grade 12, OEC students take the majority of their courses at the college level.  By grade 13, students can be full-time college students taking just one high school seminar or support class.

Standardized testing 

As a public high school in the state of Michigan, Oakland Early College students are subject to the same mandatory state testing as all other public high schools including the MEAP for ninth grade students, the ACT, the Workkeys Assessment, and the MME; the latter three being taken by students in their third year on campus.  In addition to the mandated Michigan standardized testing, OEC also maintains status as a testing site for the PLAN and PSAT.

Administration 

The Head of School at Oakland Early College is Morrison Borders.  The Superintendent of West Bloomfield School District is Dr. Gerald Hill, and the President of the School Board is Dr. Nelson Hersh.  The President of Oakland Community College's Orchard Ridge campus is Dr. Jacqueline Shadko.

Mascot 

The OEC Mascot is the OEC Cougar.

Public high schools in Michigan
University-affiliated schools in the United States
High schools in Oakland County, Michigan